The Animal is a 2001 American comedy film directed by Luke Greenfield, written by Rob Schneider and Tom Brady, and starring Schneider in the lead role, Colleen Haskell, John C. McGinley, Guy Torry, and Edward Asner. The film depicts a police station evidence clerk who is critically injured and is put back together by a mad scientist who transplants animal parts, resulting in strange changes to his behavior.

The film received negative reviews.

Plot
In the town of Elkerton, Marvin Mange is an awkward, clumsy nice-guy who dreams of being a police officer like his dad was. He continuously fails the physical test to become a full-fledged police officer, is mistreated by sleazy police sergeant Doug Sisk, and he awkwardly fumbles through a first encounter with his idol, environmental protester Rianna. He works in the police station as an evidence clerk and is friends with airport security guard Miles who is a victim of "reverse racism" and fellow cadet Fatty. While alone at the station, he receives a robbery call from a restaurant before driving off the road, causing his car to tumble down a mountain into a crash before a boulder falls on.

Days later, Marvin returns to his normal life with no memory of what happened. He is full of life while not noticing surgical marks on his back and fur on his rear end. He can outrun horses, mean dogs are scared of him, he jumps to catch frisbees in his mouth, and he does not need his asthma medicine. He thinks it is due to his consumption of "Badger Milk", which is guaranteed in the ads to make him stronger. He goes to the airport to talk to Miles about his problem. While there, Marvin sniffs out a man hiding heroin in his rectum. Marvin is declared a hero and is made a full-fledged police officer by Chief Marion Wilson.

Marvin often wakes up in strange places, and subsequently hears about animal attacks that occurred in the middle of the night. Because of these attacks, the mad scientist Dr. Wilder believes that Marvin is out of control. Wilder takes him to his laboratory, and explains about the grafts and transplants that saved Marvin's life and gave him animal powers. He gives him pointers on controlling the rampant animal urges that often prompt him to behave inappropriately in public.

Despite continuing embarrassments caused by Marvin's animal urges, his animal abilities allow him to excel as a police officer. He is partnered with Sisk, and gets a date with Rianna. Chief Wilson questions Marvin about late-night attacks on cows because one of the witnesses made a police sketch and it looks like Marvin. Chief Wilson puts Marvin on paid leave.

Rianna goes to Marvin's house, where he has barricaded himself inside. She is convinced that he cannot be behind the animal attacks. They spend the night together. Marvin insists on being tied up so he cannot hurt anyone, but Rianna unties him after he falls asleep. The police show up to arrest Marvin for an attack on a hunter that night. Rianna convinces him to run. Marvin escapes to the woods. The police organize a search party to capture Marvin. While running through the woods, Marvin finds Wilder. The scientist tells him that another patient of his is out of control.

Sgt. Sisk confronts Marvin and is about to shoot him. Rianna jumps from a tree onto Sisk. In the presence of Wilder, Miles, and Fatty, she confesses that she was also operated on by Wilder and attacked the hunter in order to protect the turkey vulture that she released into the wild. An angry mob and police arrive to take out Marvin. Miles takes the blame for everything. Once the mob thinks a black man was responsible, the mob members don't want to take action causing Chief Wilson to call off the hunt much to the dismay of Miles.

One year later, Marvin and Rianna get married, open an animal sanctuary, and have a litter of children. While watching television, they see Dr. Wilder win the Nobel Prize. He says he owes it all to his fiancée Yolanda, the spokesmodel for Badger Milk. There are large scars on her back, implying that Wilder performed the experiment on her as well.

Cast
 Rob Schneider as Marvin Mange, a police evidence clerk who gets animal parts put in him.
 Colleen Haskell as Rianna "Hummingbird" Holmes, an animal activist who Mange falls for.
 John C. McGinley as Sgt. Doug Sisk, a sleazy police sergeant of the Elkerton Police Department who picks on Mange.
 Guy Torry as Miles, an airport security guard who is friends with Mange and is a victim of "reverse racism" where he has been claiming that there is reverse racism towards him since he's black.
 Edward Asner as Chief Marion Wilson, the chief of the Elkington Police Department.
 Michael Caton as Dr. Wilder, a mad scientist who saved Mange's life by putting animal parts in him.
 Louis Lombardi as Fatty, a fellow police cadet at the Elkerton Police Department who is friends with Mange and Miles.
 Bob Rubin as Bob Harris, a farmer whose cows are attacked by Mange.
 Pilar Schneider as Mrs. De La Rosa, Marvin's neighbor.
 Scott Wilson as the unnamed Mayor of Elkerton
 Michael Papajohn as Patrolman Brady
 Ron Roggé as Patrolman Jaworski
 Raymond Ma as Mr. Tam, an Asian man whose restaurant was robbed.
 Sebastian Jude as Lost Boy
 Philip Daniel Bolden, Deker Daily, Timmy Deters, Hannah K Ford, Megan Harvey, Mitch Holleman, Mollie Rae Dodson, and Charlie Stewart as Evidence Room Kids
 Arthur Bernard as Elderly Jogger
 Tim Herzog as Badger Milk Host
 Berglind Icey as Yolanda, a woman who works in the "Badger Milk" commercial.
 Bret Smrz as the Mayor of Elkerton's son
 Norm Macdonald as a Mob Member who asks angry mob-related questions to Sisk.
 Adam Sandler as a Townie who is part of the angry mob. Sandler did his rendition of the Townie that Schneider portrayed in The Waterboy and Little Nicky.
 Brianna Brown, Amber Collins, and John Farley as Other Mob Members
 Pete as Dimples the Dog, a dog that is owned by Mrs. De La Rosa.
 Bliss as Nelly the Goat
 Louey as Henry the Orangutan
 Cloris Leachman as Cat Lady (uncredited)
 Harry Dean Stanton as Hunter (uncredited)

Wes Takahashi, former animator and visual effects supervisor for Industrial Light & Magic, makes a cameo appearance as a news reporter. Fred Stoller also cameos as a news reporter that interviews Marvin about his abilities.

Reception

Box office
The Animal debuted on June 1, 2001, grossing $19.6 million U.S. in its opening weekend (#3 behind Shrek and Pearl Harbor). With a production budget of $47 million, the movie grossed $84,772,742 internationally.

Critical response  
This film received negative reviews. Rotten Tomatoes gave the film a score of 30% based on 83 reviews, with its consensus stating: "While less offensive and more charming than recent gross-humored comedies, The Animal is still rather mediocre". Metacritic gave the film a score of 43% based on reviews from 22 critics, indicating "mixed or average reviews". Audiences polled by CinemaScore gave the film a grade B+.

Kevin Thomas of the Los Angeles Times called it "An outrageous and imaginative summer comedy."
Robert Koehler of Variety magazine wrote: "The Animal is never more nor less than stupid, but stupid in ways that deliver goofiness rather than rampant humiliation."
Peter Travers of Rolling Stone described it as "an Adam Sandler reject" and wondered how this "raunchy innuendo wrapped in a PG-13 rating" got past the censors.

Rob Schneider was nominated for a Razzie Award for Worst Actor of the Decade for his performance in the film.

Controversy
Despite mostly negative critical reaction, at the time of its release film critic David Manning gave the film critical praise. In late 2001, Manning was revealed to be a fictitious character created by Sony to fake publicity for the film. At the time, Sony claimed that the error was due to a layout artist who entered 'dummy text' into print advertisements during their design, which was accidentally never replaced with real text.

Sequel
In October 2022, it was announced a sequel is in development. In addition to reprising his role from the first film, Rob Schneider will also serve as director, from a script that he co-wrote with Patricia Schneider, and Jamie Lissow. Schneider will also serve as a producer on the movie alongside Michael McConnell. The project will be a joint-venture production between Content Partners, Revolution Studios, MarVista Entertainment, Zero Gravity Management, and Tubi Original Films. Intended to be released via streaming as an exclusive Tubi movie, the project is near being officially green-lit by the associated film studios. Principal photography is scheduled to commence in early-2023, with its tentative release scheduled for later that year.

References

External links

 
 
 
 

2001 films
2000s science fiction comedy films
American science fiction comedy films
Columbia Pictures films
Films scored by Teddy Castellucci
Films about apes
Films about birds
Films about badgers
Films about cats
Films about dogs
Films about fish
Films about horses
Happy Madison Productions films
Revolution Studios films
Films with screenplays by Rob Schneider
2001 directorial debut films
2001 comedy films
Films directed by Luke Greenfield
2000s English-language films
2000s American films